Nebria rougemonti is a species of ground beetle from a Nebriinae subfamily that is endemic to Sichuan province of China.

References

rougemonti
Beetles described in 1988
Beetles of Asia
Endemic fauna of Sichuan